More Grey Hairs is a compilation album by the American rapper Reks, released on March 10, 2009, by ShowOff Records. The album contains previously unreleased songs that were cut from Reks' previous album, Grey Hairs, and other unreleased songs recorded at that time.

It was listed by The Phoenix as one of the "Top 20 Hip-Hop Albums of 2009".

Track listing

References

External links
 

Reks albums
2009 compilation albums
Albums produced by DJ Premier
Albums produced by Statik Selektah